The Biblical Politics of John Locke is a 2004 book by Kim Ian Parker, in which the author provides an account of the impact of the Bible on John Locke’s thought.

References

External links
The Biblical Politics of John Locke

2004 non-fiction books
Works about John Locke
Books in political philosophy
Books about the Bible
Wilfrid Laurier University Press books